The Full Blooded Italians (or F.B.I.) are an American professional wrestling stable and tag team that wrestled for Extreme Championship Wrestling (ECW) from the mid-1990s to early-2000s and for World Wrestling Entertainment (WWE) during the mid-2000s.

History

Extreme Championship Wrestling
The original Full Blooded Italians began in Extreme Championship Wrestling (ECW). After suffering a legitimate concussion at Wrestlepalooza in August 1995, J.T. Smith adopted the gimmick of believing himself to be an Old World Italian (despite being African American). Smith formed an alliance with the Italian American wrestler Val Puccio.

In April 1996 at Massacre on Queens Boulevard, Smith announced that he had discovered that Damien Stone was his Sicilian cousin, dubbing him "Little Guido". The partnership between Smith and Little Guido expanded to include multiple other wrestlers, including Tracy Smothers and Tommy Rich. Guido has been involved in every ECW and/or WWE incarnation of the F.B.I. The running gag of the group was that most of the wrestlers were obviously not of Italian descent, but they often claimed to be and acted in stereotypical Italian American ways, including none-too-subtle Mafia references, constant hand gestures, and praising famous Italian figures such as Frank Sinatra and Rocky Balboa. During their ECW run, the crowd would regularly chant "Where's my pizza?" at the group. The group would routinely come out to N-Trance's cover of "Stayin' Alive" and challenge their opponents to dance-offs.

The group imploded when Smothers and Rich departed the company, leaving Sal E. Graziano to manage Little Guido on his own. The group became less of a comedy act and more of a serious tandem until Tony Mamaluke was added to the duo in early 2000. Together, managed by Graziano, the group feuded with Mikey Whipwreck and Yoshihiro Tajiri, a team led by The Sinister Minister, over the ECW World Tag Team Championship. The group vied for number one contendership of the title in the company's dying months.

World Wrestling Entertainment

First SmackDown! Incarnation

Little Guido had been competing on the SmackDown brand as Nunzio.  After a loss to Rikishi, Nunzio threatened to bring in his "family" to gain revenge. The next week, he directed Chuck Palumbo and Johnny "The Bull" Stamboli to attack Rikishi.  This latest incarnation was mainly referred to simply as "The FBI". It was heavily implied to be a mafia organization led by Nunzio, loosely based on the movie Goodfellas. This was further reinforced by video vignettes stylized by stakeout footage showing the trio involved with organized crime in New York City backstreets. Despite the publicity, they had very little success at first.  Their fortunes changed after using a gimmick of running an illegal betting ring in the backstage area. This led to a series of feuds with notable wrestlers and tag teams, including Los Guerreros, Chris Benoit, Rhyno, and the APA. The FBI was also used by Mr. McMahon and Jamie Noble (Nunzio's storyline cousin) to attack their rivals. When the group turned into fan favorites, they grew in popularity but just as they were getting over, Palumbo was sent to the WWE's Raw brand. This left Nunzio and Stamboli in the group. In November 2004, Palumbo and Stamboli were released, but Nunzio retained his current character.

Second SmackDown! Incarnation
Vito appeared on the August 6, 2005 episode of Velocity by aiding Nunzio with a blackjack to help him win the Cruiserweight Championship from Paul London. Soon after, a profile of Vito in SmackDown! Magazine "officially" referred to the new twosome as "The F.B.I.". The two mainly competed in singles competition. Unlike previous members of the team, Vito often avoided helping Nunzio to keep himself out of peril. The team initially ended when the two had an argument in the ring. A few weeks later, Nunzio took offense to people thinking their alliance was over, and greater offense to suggestions that Vito was a cross-dresser. But once Nunzio saw the allegations to be true, he ended his ties to Vito.

ECW Brand

The F.B.I. from the original Extreme Championship Wrestling reunited briefly at the first-ever One Night Stand pay-per-view event in 2005. Members Tracy Smothers, Tony Mamaluke, Big Guido and J.T. Smith accompanied Little Guido for his match, and then reappeared in the final segment to close the show.

The final WWE incarnation of The FBI debuted at the 2006 event. Little Guido had moved over to the ECW brand to reunite his tag team with Mamaluke. They were now managed by newest member Trinity. Big Guido was also in their corner for the pay-per-view and ECW television debut, but left the company that same week. The tag team mainly served as enhancement talent. Trinity eventually began making appearances without the tag team, and Tony Mamaluke was released from his WWE contract on January 18, 2007.

Independent circuit

After their release from WWE, Stamboli and Palumbo formed a tag team version of the F.B.I. in All Japan Pro Wrestling. Then they went to the Italy-based Nu-Wrestling Evolution, using the gimmick to make themselves top fan favorites in the company until they left the promotion at the end of the year. Also they went to Mexico and split up in 2006. On November 15, 2008, Little Guido and Tracy Smothers formed a version of the F.B.I. in Jersey All Pro Wrestling and defeated The Latin American Xchange in their first match to win the Tag Team Championship. Their success did not last long, as the F.B.I. lost the titles to D-N-A (Dixie and Azrieal) on December 13.

The Full Blooded Italians were announced for the first-ever match of the new Extreme Reunion organization in 2009; which is conceived as a continuation of the original Extreme Championship Wrestling. Their opponents were announced as The Blue World Order (Stevie Richards and the Blue Meanie). They would lose to them. They reunited again on October 6, 2012, being defeated by Danny Doring and Roadkill in the House of Hardcore's first show.

Total Nonstop Action Wrestling
On August 4, 2010, it was confirmed that the F.B.I. would be taking part in Total Nonstop Action Wrestling's ECW reunion show, Hardcore Justice, on August 8. At the event Little Guido, Tony Mamaluke (billed as Tony Luke) and Tracy Smothers, accompanied by Sal E. Graziano, defeated Kid Kash, Simon Diamond and Johnny Swinger in a six-man tag team match. On the following edition of TNA Impact!, the ECW alumni, known collectively as EV 2.0 and represented by F.B.I. members Guido and Luke, were assaulted by A.J. Styles, Kazarian, Robert Roode, James Storm, Douglas Williams and Matt Morgan of Ric Flair's  stable, who thought they didn't deserve to be in TNA. On the August 26 edition of Impact! Guido and Luke were squashed by Roode and Storm in a tag team match. The match ended F.B.I.'s association with TNA.

Incarnations

Championships and accomplishments
Extreme Championship Wrestling
ECW World Tag Team Championship (2 times) – Guido and Smothers (1) and Guido and Mamaluke (1)
Jersey All Pro Wrestling
JAPW Tag Team Championship (1 time) – Maritato and Smothers
World Wrestling Entertainment
WWE Cruiserweight Championship (2 times) – Nunzio
Toryumon
Yamaha Cup (2006) – Palumbo and Stamboli

See also
The Mamalukes

References

Extreme Championship Wrestling teams and stables
ECW (WWE) teams and stables
Impact Wrestling teams and stables
WWE teams and stables
Independent promotions teams and stables
1996 establishments in the United States